MS Oldenburg is a British passenger ferry serving the island of Lundy in the Bristol Channel.

The Oldenburg was named after the former grand duchy of Oldenburg, Germany, and launched on 29 March 1958 in Bremen. On 6 August she was delivered to Deutsche Bundesbahn Schiffsdienst Wangerooge, and used for a ferry service between the mainland and the Frisian island of Wangerooge.

She was first chartered in winter of 1975 by Reederei Warrings for duty-free shopping cruises in East Frisia. In 1982 she was sold to Harle-Reederei Warrings in Carolinensiel, Lower Saxony, Germany.

In November 1985 she was sold to the Lundy Co. Ltd. to replace Lundy's transport boat, the Polar Bear. After a refurbishment at Appledore Shipyard including fitting a new crane and bringing the ship up to modern British shipping standards, she began her journeys for passengers and supplies to the island of Lundy in May 1986.

In 1999, the Lundy Co. Ltd received a Heritage Lottery Fund Grant which was used to upgrade the ship with two new 6-cylinder Cummins KT19-M425 Diesel Engines, each capable of producing 317kW (425HP) at 1800RPM, increasing her top speed from 11.5 to 12.5 Knots. The grant was also used to construct a new aft canopy and undertake a refurbishment programme, bringing the total passenger capacity count to 267.

Every year, the MS Oldenburg enters Sharpness docks for her annual refit. During these refits, essential maintenance is carried out in dry dock which are not possible during the sailing season. During the late 2019 refit, MS Oldenburg was fitted with a new rudder stock and foredeck crane, replacing the crane installed at the beginning of her Lundy tenure in 1986.

Gallery

References

External links 

 Oldenburg on Lundy Island
 Dates on faktacomfartyg 
Pictures on Flickr

Ferries of England
1958 ships
Ferries of South West England
Water transport in Devon
Lundy